Mark Anthony Ripperger  (born August 6, 1980) is an American Major League Baseball (MLB) umpire. He made his Major League umpiring debut on September 30, 2010. After Ripperger served as a minor–league replacement umpire, he was promoted to full–time status prior to the 2015 season. His uniform number is 90.

See also 

 List of Major League Baseball umpires

References

External links 
Retrosheet
The Baseball Cube
Close Call Sports

1980 births
Living people
Major League Baseball umpires
Sportspeople from Escondido, California